is an Echizen Railway Mikuni Awara Line railway station located in the city of Sakai, Fukui Prefecture, Japan.

Lines

Station layout
The station consists of one side platform serving a single bi-directional track. The station is unattended.

Adjacent stations

History
Taromaru Angelland Station was opened on December 30, 1928. On September 1, 1942 the Keifuku Electric Railway merged with Mikuni Awara Electric Railway. Operations were halted from June 25, 2001. The station reopened on August 10, 2003 as an Echizen Railway station. The station was renamed to its present name on March 25, 2017.

Passenger statistics
In fiscal 2015, the station was used by an average of 132 passengers daily (boarding passengers only).

Surrounding area
Newly built residences lie to the east of the station, while rice fields and a park-and-ride lot are to the west.
JR West Harue Station is approximately two kilometers east of the station.
Other points of interest include:
Fukui Prefecture Drivers Education Center (Testing Center)
Sakai City Bunka-no-Mori cultural facility
Heartpia Harue (Sakai City Harue Library, meeting halls)
Communication Park
Fukui Prefecture Children's Science Museum (Engelland Fukui)

See also
 List of railway stations in Japan

References

External links

  

Railway stations in Fukui Prefecture
Railway stations in Japan opened in 1928
Mikuni Awara Line
Sakai, Fukui